Well Oiled is rock band the Quireboys's fourth studio album, released in 2004. It is the second album recorded since the band re-united, following on from This Is Rock'N'Roll, and their first for the Steamhammer label.

Allmusic reviewer Greg Prato gave it three and a half stars, stating "their bluesy, brawlin', whiskey-soaked style remains very much intact throughout". Blabbermouth.net gave it 7.5 out of 10, calling it "Good Stuff". It also received a positive review from the Southern Daily Echo, with Ali Masud calling it "A case of if it ain't broke don't fix it.".

Track listing
 "Good to See You"
 "The Finer Stuff"
 "Lorraine Lorraine"
 "Too Familiar"
 "You've Got a Nerve"
 "What's Your Name"
 "Sweet as the Rain"
 "The Last Fence" 
 "Black Mariah"

Band
Spike – vocals
Guy Griffin – guitar
Paul Guerin – guitar
Nigel Mogg – bass
Pip Mailing – drums
Keith Weir – keyboards

Additional musicians
Steve 'Smoothy' Damon – harmonica
Danni Nicholls – backing vocals

References

2004 albums
The Quireboys albums
SPV/Steamhammer albums